Greater Latrobe Senior High School is a public high school in Latrobe, Pennsylvania, United States. Greater Latrobe is the only senior high school in the Greater Latrobe School District which serves Latrobe, Youngstown, and Unity Township.

Athletics 
The following sports are offered at Greater Latrobe:

 Baseball
 Basketball
 Cross Country
 Football
 Golf
 Ice hockey
 Lacrosse
 Soccer
 Softball
 Swimming
 Tennis
 Track and field
 Volleyball
 Wrestling

State championships
 1968 State Football Champions
 2005 Girls Cross Country State Champions
 2008 Ice Hockey State Champions
 2009 Ice Hockey State Champions
 2009 Boys Golf State Champions
 2010 Ice Hockey State Champions
 2013 Ice Hockey State Champions
 2017 Baseball State Champions

Notable alumni 
 Fred Rogers — creator, showrunner and host of the preschool television series Mister Rogers' Neighborhood, which ran from 1968 to 2001.
 Lou Klimchock — 13-year veteran of Major League Baseball. Infielder for the Kansas City Athletics, Milwaukee Braves, Washington Senators, New York Mets, and Cleveland Indians.
 Arnold Palmer - Professional golfer, PGA champion

References

External links
 

Schools in Westmoreland County, Pennsylvania
Public high schools in Pennsylvania